Ahmed Arifi Pasha (1830 – 1895/96) was an Ottoman noble, senator, statesman and reformist, who served as Grand Vizier of the Ottoman Empire in 1879.  In contemporary English-language accounts he was known as Aarifi Pasha. He was a liberal and supported Midhat Pasha’s efforts to introduce the First Constitutional Era.

Biography 
He was born in Istanbul in 1830, his father was a diplomat named Şekip Pasha (in contemporary English Shekib Pasha). He accompanied his father on diplomatic missions to various European capitals, including Rome, Vienna, and Paris.  He acquired a good knowledge of French.  He served in a series of posts at home and abroad, including ambassador to Vienna and later ambassador to Paris.

On July 28, 1879, he became Grand Vizier but held the post for little more than a month.

He later held various other posts and died in 1895/96.

See also 
List of Ottoman grand viziers

Bibliography

References

Pashas
1830 births
1895 deaths
19th-century Grand Viziers of the Ottoman Empire
Ministers of Foreign Affairs of the Ottoman Empire
Members of the Senate of the Ottoman Empire